Djamal Abdoulaye Mahamat Bindi (born 26 April 1983 in Tripoli), known as Mahamat, is a Libyan footballer who plays as a defensive midfielder.

Club career
After an unassuming spell with S.C. Salgueiros in Portugal (no appearances), Mahamat moved to France and remained in the country for four of the five following years, playing exclusively in amateur football and mainly with L'Entente SSG. In the 2006–07 season, aged 23, he made his professional debuts, appearing for and G.D. Estoril Praia in the Portuguese second division.

In November 2007, Mahamat had unsuccessful trials in England with Hartlepool United and Bradford City. In the 2008 summer he returned from the French lower leagues and signed for S.C. Beira-Mar, also in the Portuguese second level. After a weak first year – 15 games – he became an undisputed first-choice for the Aveiro club.

Mahamat made his Primeira Liga debut on 15 August 2010, playing 90 minutes in a 0–0 home draw against U.D. Leiria, and contributing with three goals as Beira-Mar eventually retained their status. In May 2011, just weeks after the season ended, he was purchased by fellow league side S.C. Braga for an undisclosed fee; on 1 June 2011 his transfer was confirmed, with the player signing a four-year contract and reuniting with Beira-Mar boss Leonardo Jardim.

International career
Mahamat was first called up by Libya in 2010 by Marcos Paquetá. Since then, he featured regularly for the national team, helping it qualify to the 2012 Africa Cup of Nations, and being selected for the 23-men squad for the finals in Equatorial Guinea and Gabon.

International goals
 (Libya score listed first, score column indicates score after each Mahamat goal)

Personal life
Mahamat's father was also a footballer. He played for the Libyan national team from 1977 to 1986.

Honours
Braga
Taça da Liga: 2012–13

References

External links

1983 births
Living people
People from Tripoli, Libya
Libyan people of Chadian descent
Libyan footballers
Association football midfielders
Primeira Liga players
Liga Portugal 2 players
S.C. Salgueiros players
G.D. Estoril Praia players
S.C. Beira-Mar players
S.C. Braga players
Gil Vicente F.C. players
Entente SSG players
Libya international footballers
2012 Africa Cup of Nations players
Libyan expatriate footballers
Expatriate footballers in Portugal
Expatriate footballers in France
Libyan expatriate sportspeople in Portugal
Libyan expatriates in France